Ženik is a settlement in the Municipality of Sveti Jurij ob Ščavnici in northeastern Slovenia. It lies along the road from Stara Gora towards Brezje and Sovjak in the hills just south of Sveti Jurij ob Ščavnici. The area is part of the traditional region of Styria and is now included in the Mura Statistical Region.

References

External links
Ženik at Geopedia

Populated places in the Municipality of Sveti Jurij ob Ščavnici